Marcel Allain (28 May 1888 – 23 December 1944) was a French racing cyclist. He rode in the 1923 Tour de France.

References

1888 births
1944 deaths
French male cyclists
Place of birth missing